Die Reklamation (German: The Complaint) is the debut studio album by German band Wir sind Helden, released on 7 July 2003 by Labels, a subsidiary of EMI. It sold over 800,000 copies in Germany and reached four times Platinum. The album follows lead singer Judith Holofernes' limited self-produced solo album Kamikazefliege, which had already included two tracks from this album: “Aurélie” and “Außer dir”.

Critical reception

The album was a success with the critics. laut.de gave it five out of five points calling it “the perfect soundtrack for an urban summer”. They describe the lyrics as “awesome and damn clever” and Judith Holofernes as “one of the most intelligent and funniest women of our time.” kulturnews.de also praised the lyrics and the originality of the album, calling Wir sind Helden worthy successors of Neue Deutsche Welle acts like Nena.

Commercial performance
The album peaked at #2 on the German album chart, at #3 in Austria and at #38 in Switzerland. More than 800,000 copies of the album were sold in Germany alone and was awarded triple platinum. The album remains one of the most successful German albums ever (#19 based on chart position). It managed to stay in the German Albums Chart for a total of 94 weeks, making it the album, that stayed the longest time on that chart in their career

Four singles were released off the album: “Guten Tag”, “Müssen nur wollen”, “Aurélie” and “Denkmal”. In 2004, a new version of the album with a red cover called “Die rote Reklamation” (“The Red Complaint”) was released. This limited tour edition included the official video clips of all four singles and two short movies about the band.

Awards

Wir sind Helden were awarded three ECHO awards in 2004 related to their debut album making them the most successful act of that year.

Best Marketing (to EMI)
Best national video clip (for “Müssen nur wollen”)
Best national newcomer (Radio award)

Track listing
All tracks written by Wir Sind Helden.

Charts

Weekly charts

Year-end charts

References

External links
Die Reklamation lyrics

2003 debut albums
Wir sind Helden albums
German-language albums
European Border Breakers Award-winning albums